Quilpie is a rural town and locality in the Shire of Quilpie, Queensland, Australia.

The town is the administrative centre of the Quilpie Shire local government area. The town of Toompine is also within the locality.

The economy of the area is based on the grazing and mining industries. The area has one of the largest deposits of boulder opal in the world, and also has extensive deposits of gas and oil.

Geography
Quilpie is in Channel Country on the banks of the Bulloo River. Quilpie is the administrative centre of the Quilpie Shire.

The town of Toompine is within the locality of Quilpie

Other townships in the shire include Adavale and Eromanga.

Quilpie has quite a few trees but sometimes drought takes over and the landscape can become dry and desolate.

History
Quilpie is believed to lie on the border of the Bunthamurra and Margany Indigenous Australian tribal areas.

Margany (also known as Marganj, Mardigan, Marukanji, Maranganji) is an Australian Aboriginal language spoken by the Margany people. The Margany language region includes the landscape within the local government boundaries of the Quilpie Shire, taking in Quilpie, Cheepie and Beechal extending towards Eulo and Thargomindah, as well as the properties of Dynevor Downs and Ardoch.

Toompine Provisional School and Duck Creek Provisional School both opened in 1900. In 1901 they became half-time schools (meaning they shared a single teacher between the two schools). Toompine Provisional School closed in July 1902, enabling Duck Creek Provisional School to revert to full-time status. Due to low student numbers, Duck Creek Provisional School closed in 1905.

Quilpie was gazetted as a town in 1917 owing to the Western railway line that was laid down from Brisbane. It takes its name from the Indigenous Australian word for stone curlew, quilpeta. The name was proposed by pastoralist James Hammond of Tenham Station. The Queensland Railways Department mistakenly named the railway station Quillpill. The town and station name were standardised to Quilpie on 16 June 1917 by the Governor in Council.

Quilpie State School opened on 10 September 1918. The school began offering secondary education in 1966. On 5 December 2008 it was renamed Quilpie State College.

The first post office was opened in 1921. Two years later the telephone reached Quilpie .

A fire destroyed a block of the main street in 1926. With no town water the residents watched helplessly.

In 1927 the first court house was established.

Prior to 1930, Quilpie was within the Shire of Adavale, headquartered at Adavale. However, the decision to route the railway line through Quilpie rather than Adavale had led to a population drift away from Adavale making Quilpie the larger town. On 17 July 1930, there was a re-organisation of local government in the district, resulting in the abolition of the Shire of Adavale and the creation of the Shire of Quilpie with Quilpie as its headquarters.

A bore was sunk into the Great Artesian Basin in 1933. It provided drinking water for the town and for a period between 1952 and 1963 the hot water was used to generate electricity for the town.

St Finbarr's Catholic School opened in early 1950, shortly after the arrival in January 1950 of three Sisters of St Joseph of the Sacred Heart, Sisters Macrina, Carmel and Magdalen. By the end of 1950, over 60 children were enrolled. A boarding school for boys and girls was opened in 1951. The first lay teacher, Michael West, was appointed in 1983. When the boarding facility closed in 2008, it was the last rural Catholic primary boarding school in Queensland. In 2009, the first lay principal, Aaron Wells, was appointed and the administration of the school passed from the Sisters to the Catholic Education Office of the Roman Catholic Diocese of Toowoomba who operate the school in the Mary MacKillop tradition (MacKillop being the founder of the Sisters of St Joseph).

Goombie State School opened on Goombie Station (north of Quilpie at ) on 27 January 1875 and closed on 9 December 1977.

Around 14% of the population of Quilpie identity as Aboriginal or Torres Strait Islander and around 2% were born outside Australia.

The current Quilpie Public Library building opened in 2005.

Economy
The area is wholly devoted to grazing. Boulder opal, oil and gas mining are major secondary industries for the local economy. The majority of the employees of these industries are local residents, with low rates of both unemployment and itinerant work.

Quilpie has one opal mining field; Toompine Field is located between Quilpie and Yowah.

Flora and fauna
The most common species of trees in the district are:
 Mulga
 Gidgee
 Red river gum
 Bloodwood
 Sandalwood
 Beefwood
There are a large range of animals (including reptiles and insects) that can be found in the area including:
 Bearded dragon
 Sand goanna (Varanus gouldii) – bungarra in some aboriginal languages
 Black-headed python
 Inland taipan (Oxyuranus microlepidotus) – also known as western taipan and fierce snake
 Mulga snake (Pseudechis australis) – also known as the king brown
 Brolga (Grus rubicunda)
 Emu (Dromaius novaehollandiae)
 Wedge-tailed eagle (Aquila audax)
 Red kangaroo (Macropus rufus)
 Eastern grey kangaroo (Macropus giganteus)
 Common wallaroo (Macropus robustus)
 Bilby (Macrotis lagotis)
 Water rat (Hydromys chrysogaster)
 Dingo

Facilities and services
Quilpie residents enjoy free access to many amenities including the town library, swimming pool, golf course, museum, sports grounds, an air-conditioned hall and supper room etc. There are well stocked stores and plenty of attractions for visitors with displays of opals and the works of local artists and as well as an information centre. The Brick Hotel has been restored to house displays of opal and art and provide a community learning space.

Quilpie Shire Council operates Quilpie Shire Library, 52 Brolga Street, Quilpie.

The Quilpie branch of the Queensland Country Women's Association has its rooms at 17 Brolga Street.

Education
Quilpie State College is a government primary and secondary (Early Childhood-10) school for boys and girls at Cnr Chulungra & Boonkai Streets. In 2017, the school had an enrolment of 61 students with 12 teachers (11 full-time equivalent) and 12 non-teaching staff (9 full-time equivalent).

For Students wanting to study Year 11 and 12, the closest secondary school is Charleville State High School in Charleville, 208 kilometres (129 mi) to the east. Alternatively, Year 11 and 12 students can also study through the Charleville School of Distance Education or move away to various boarding schools.

St Finbarr's School is a Catholic primary (Prep-6) school for boys and girls at Jabiru Street. In 2017, the school had an enrolment of 30 students with 5 teachers (3 full-time equivalent) and 5 non-teaching staff (2 full-time equivalent).

Eromanga State School currently operates in the township of Eromanga approximately 90 km west of Quilpie.  It has had a chequered history when it was open in the following years – 1897–1908, 1910–1911, 1917–1936, 1967–1981, 1990–present.

Many other public schools have operated in the Quilpie district.  The Milo Provisional School was functional between 1888 and 1906. Adavale State School had a long history from 1888 to 1968.  Cheepie State School opened in 1915 and closed in 1974.  The Toompine Provisional School was open between 1900 and 1902, for a time operating as a half-time school with Duck Creek State School which was open between 1901 and 1905.  The Goombie State School operated between 1875 and 1977.

Climate

Quilpie experiences a hot semi-arid climate (Köppen: BSh, Trewartha: BShl); with very hot summers with occasional rains; warm to hot, relatively dry springs and autumns; and mild, dry winters.

Events
 The Pride of the West festival is held in September every year.
 The Quilpie Cup Races
 The Kangaranga Do festival is held in September every year on the Tuesday before the Birdsville Races.

Notable people from Quilpie
 Vaughan Johnson, Queensland state politician
 Ewen Jones, Australian federal politician
 Professor Don Markwell, social scientist and educational leader
 Sandy McPhie, former Queensland state politician
 Justine Saunders, late Australian actor

Gallery

See also

 Quilpie Airport

References

Further reading

External links

 University of Queensland: Queensland Places: Quilpie and Quilpie Shire
 Official website of Shire of Quilpie
 Town map of Quilie, 1984
 Living in Quilpie by Ben Hall, a 3 min 20 sec video, published by State Library of Queensland as part of Storylines:Q150 digital stories

Towns in Queensland
South West Queensland
Shire of Quilpie
Populated places established in 1917
1917 establishments in Australia
Localities in Queensland